Častkovce is a village and municipality in Nové Mesto nad Váhom District in the Trenčín Region of western Slovakia.

History
In historical records the village was first mentioned in 1392.

Geography
The municipality lies at an altitude of 178 metres and covers an area of 7.541 km². It has a population of about 1014 people.

Genealogical resources

The records for genealogical research are available at the state archive "Statny Archiv in Bratislava, Slovakia"

 Roman Catholic church records (births/marriages/deaths): 1705-1907 (parish B)
 Lutheran church records (births/marriages/deaths): 1871-1922 (parish B)

See also
 List of municipalities and towns in Slovakia

References

External links

 Official page
http://www.statistics.sk/mosmis/eng/run.html
Surnames of living people in Castkovce

Villages and municipalities in Nové Mesto nad Váhom District